Elections to Blackburn with Darwen Borough Council in June 2004 heralded a shock result as Labour council leader Sir Bill Taylor lost his seat to Liberal Democrat Zamir Khan. "This morning as I was shaving I thought I could get beat and that is what happened", commented Taylor after the result. "I canvassed more for this election than for any other. I spoke to more than a thousand people on their doorsteps and was not given any suggestion there were any difficulties." Liberal Democrat leader Paul Browne blamed the defeat on dissatisfaction with British foreign policy, particularly in areas with high numbers of Muslim voters: "Sir Bill has gone because of what has happened in Iraq. Simple." Only 63 of the 64 seats on the council were filled as the Earcroft ward by-election took place a month after due to the death of Mayor Mike Barratt. Yusuf Sidat was elected as an independent in Queen's Park Ward.

Election result

|-
!colspan=2|Parties
!Seats
!Previous
!NetGain/Loss
|-
| 
|33||35||-2
|-
| 
|17||15||+2
|-
| 
|12||8||+4
|-
|
|align=left|Independent
|1||2||-1
|-
!colspan=2|Total!!63!!60
|}

Source:

Wards

Corporation Park
Elected
Arshid Mahmood (Lab) 790
Paul James McGurty (Con) 734
Abdul Rehman (LD) 884

Electorate 4617
Ballot Papers 2781
% Poll 60.23

References

2004 English local elections
2004
2000s in Lancashire